Jaap Schouten (born 9 December 1984 in The Hague) is a Dutch rower.

References 
 

1984 births
Living people
Dutch male rowers
Sportspeople from The Hague
World Rowing Championships medalists for the Netherlands
21st-century Dutch people